The Anāl  (also spelled as Anaal) are some of the oldest settlers of the present day Manipur. They belong to the Naga tribe native to Manipur state in North-East India and part of Myanmar. The name "Anal" was given by the Meitei people of Manipur valley. They are listed as a Scheduled Tribe, in accordance with The Scheduled Castes and Scheduled Tribes Orders (Amendment) Act, 1976 Indian Constitution. The Anāl tribe is one of the 'sixty six Naga tribes' of the Naga ancestral homeland. The members of this tribe are found both in India and Myanmar. In India, they are situated in the States of Manipur and Nagaland but mostly concentrated in the former. In the State of Manipur, the Anāl Naga population concentrated in Chandel and a few Anāl villages are located in its neighbouring districts, Churachandpur district has about three villages and Thoubal district has one or two.

The Anāls in Myanmar live in the Sagaing sub-division. The Anāl population in this part has been dwindling. At present, there are three Anāl villages, 'Nga Kala, Napalun and Haika'. Formerly the Anāls had no problem to move or visit Anāl areas now in Myanmar and vice versa. However, with the demarcation of boundaries, they came under two distinct units and the consequent restriction imposed on the movement of the people of both sides, the Anāls had to stop such free movement between them. Consequently, there has not been any interaction between the members of the same tribe now existing under two different countries. The Anāl community is one of the oldest inhabitants of the hill areas in Manipur state. The archaeological findings at Chakpikarong also point it. According to Census of India, the Anāl population was 94,242 and 1991 census placed as 82,693.

The Anāl Naga is recognized as a tribe in Manipur since 1951. This recognition of Anāl tribe was done by Rochunga Pudaite who met the Prime Minister Jawaharlal Nehru in Delhi in 1951 and requested him to give Scheduled Tribe recognition to the Hmar tribe of Northeast India. The PM then asked him if he knew of the existence of other tribes which had not been included in the list. Rochunga then added the tribes of Anāl, Kom, Paite, Vaiphei, Ralte, Chothe and others, thus paving the way for their recognition. However, it was only after the Scheduled Tribes Reorganisation in 1956 that all the aforementioned tribes were recognised by the Manipur government. Therefore, Anāl Naga is one of 33 tribes in Manipur. The Anāl Language falls under Tibeto-Burman languages family. Anāls are recognised as one of the "Naga" tribes of Manipur and part of the List of Naga tribes by the state government of Manipur.

History
The Anāl tribe is one of the oldest indigenous tribes in the state of Manipur in Northeast India. Chakpikarong is a land of the Anāls since the time the earliest settlers occupied the hill country of Manipur. The Anāls settled both in India and Myanmar, their settlements crossed the Indo-Myanmar border. In India, the members of the tribe are found in the state of Manipur, mainly in Chandel district and a few villages in Churachandpur district and Thoubal district. There are a hundred and forty one villages in Chandel district. The neighbouring districts, Churachanpur district has three Anāl villages, namely Kolen, Dutejol and Warkhu, and the Thoubal district has one Anāl village- Moirankhom. Under the Myanmar administrative unit, there are three Anāl villages namely, Ngakala, Napaleen and Haika. According to the census report of 2001, the total Anāl population in India is 21,242. The Anāl population in Myanmar is not known because many of them are assimilated to the major community. Originally, the Anāls were animistic but are now largely Christian. However, Christianity became a religion for the Anāls only after India's independence. Today, more than 95 per cent of Anāls are Christians and are concentrated in Chandel of Manipur.

The Anāls are amongst the indigenous of Manipur. The history of Moirang (a Meitei kingdom) and the Anāl traditional songs and tales suggests an existence in the presence of inhabited areas since the beginning of the 1st century AD or much earlier. The Anāl cultural and traditional relationship with the Meitei brethren dates backs to 33 AD Legend has it that the Meitei King Wangbarel (Pakhangba) married an Anāl woman belonging to the Wanglum clan of Anāl Khullen.

Folklore
In the words of Horam, in ‘Naga Polity, "it can be said that the Nagas at first live in stone caves or in the womb of the earth". YL. Roland Shemmi also writes, "Angami, Lotha, Rengam belief that they came out from the earth hole. Tangkhul Naga came out from earth hole at Hundung. Ao tribe believes that they were the first to come out of underground cave". Thus cave theory as an epicenter of their origin is common among many tribes and all the Nagas tribe shared this theory. Anāl legend states that the Anāl, together with the other Pakan tribes, originated in Mongolia. They lived in a cave guarded by a man-eating tiger. Two Anāls, Hanshu and Hantha, killed the tiger with the help of birds from the sky. After the tiger's death, the tribes left the cave, traveling through China, Tibet, and numerous other areas before settling in Manipur. The Anāls are divided into two groups based on who they believe they are descended from, Hanshu and Hantha .

Etymology 
The origin of the name Anal is not clear.  One hypothesis is that the name derives from the Meitei word anan, which means "clean," suggesting that the group had a reputation for cleanliness. The Anaal generally describe themselves as the Pakan.

Ethnic identity
The political relationship between the Nagas and the Kukis since the eve of British colonialism to post-British era has always been opposed to one another. The Anāls oral history says they were always at war with the Kukis. In Chakpikarong (The Anāls Naga habitation) Stone Age culture age has been explored and found the existence of this culture. This shows the Anāl Naga tribe is one of the oldest tribes of Manipur state. The oral history of the Anāls says that Anāls were oppressed by the Kukis during the Kuki rebellion of 1917.

Demographics
The Anāls live in the Manipur region of Northeast India, which is surrounded by the Imphal valley to the north, Churachandpur district to the west, the Chin Hills to the south and Kabaw valley to the east. The area is very hilly, with thick jungles and many wild animals. According to the 2001 census, there are approximately 94,242 Anāls in Manipur. In 1981 they were living in 95 villages. In 1981 they were living in 95 villages.

Literacy and educational level
According to Census India in the year 2001, the Scheduled Tribe (ST) population in Manipur recorded 65.9 per cent literacy, which is above the national average for STs (47.1%). Of the thirteen major STs, the Anāls recorded the fourth highest literacy rate of 73.9% while Hmar recorded the highest literacy of 79.8 per cent, followed by Paite (79%), Any Mizo tribes (74%) and Tangkhul (72.7%).

Social life
The Anāls have many unique social practices and customs. One such trait is the division of the tribe's clans into two distinct groups, viz., 'Mosum' and 'Murchal'. Marriages may occur only between the members of these two blocks. Intra-marriage (such as a member of a Musum clan marrying someone from another Musum clan, or vice versa) leads to ostracism of the concerned couple. Another practice is that of adopting a person from another tribe (especially an in-law) into a clan from the group opposite to the spouse's group. This is done to show the newcomer familial affection and provide him/her with a tribe connection should any need arise where the original family is too far away to help or intervene. 

The economy of Anāls is primarily based on crude agriculture.

The Anāls' political system, since time immemorial, is democratic in nature and practice. This could be evinced by the election of village authority: the chief and his associates are elected by either voice vote or raise hand.

The Anāl traditionally lived in windowless wooden houses with thatched roofs, erected above ground level. The houses had two doors of different sizes and two rooms, a bedroom and a storeroom.  Now, however, it is rare to see such houses as the people moved on to more efficient and modern buildings in keeping with the times. 

Anāl men traditionally wear a lungi (similar to a dhoti) and a simple shirt, called a pakan lungum; they also strap on a basket for carrying dao and other tools. Women wear undergarments, a skirt, blouse, and shawl, which cover them from their heads to their knees; they also carry a basket(Anal:Bowl). Both sexes can wear jewellery, including rings, necklaces, and bracelets, as well as special long earrings made from insect wings. Traditionally clothing is made by the women.

Anāl are traditionally monogamous, although cases of polygyny have been reported. In order to marry, an Anāl man must pay a bride price; after marriage, the wife moves to the husband's home. Divorce is permitted among the Anāl, although a fine may be incurred.

The Anāl were traditionally polytheistic, believing in a supreme creator named Asapavan, as well as a secondary deity named Wangparel and numerous spirits. The largest Anāl rite is called Akam, which is divided into six stages (Judong, Bhuthawsing, Hni, Sapia, Akapidam, and Dathu) and takes six years to complete. During the Akam, the Anāl sacrifice mithun and pigs and offer a feast to the community. Most Anāls have now converted to Christianity.  The term Asapavan is now used to refer in general to God

Traditionally, Anāl men work as carpenters, particularly the manufacture of bamboo furniture, and in basketry. Women traditionally specialized in weaving and spinning cotton, which is grown locally. Due to modernization and competition from factory-produced goods, many traditional methods have been abandoned. They are also farmers, harvesting rice, corn, yam soybeans, pumpkins, tomatoes, and gourds.

The Anāl have many traditional musical instruments, including the khuwang (drum), sanamba (three-stringed fiddle), dolkhuwang (gong), pengkhul (trumpet), tilli (flageolet), rasem (a pipe instrument), and diengdong (xylophone) They are good dancers and their traditional dances include the kamdam, which is performed by young people for the akam festival, and the ludam, which celebrated victorious headhunting.

Notable festivals include the Chavan Kumhrin celebration, observed every year on the 23rd of October. It is a kind of harvest festival, where the people give thanks for the harvest by bringing paddy, vegetables and fruits of the season's first crops and offer them to God. The day is marked by a church service in every village where the people gather to pray and offer a portion of their harvest. It is also followed by sports or festivities, and even a feast in the village. Other festivals are traditional celebrations such as Christmas holidays and New Year's. Both are celebrated in a grand manner, with the youths putting up decorations in their respective villages, holding carols, night services and organising sports or contests. 

Food habits of the Anāl include fish, eggs, beef, pork, and other kinds of meat as well as fruits and vegetables. Although traditionally they do not drink milk, some families now drink it with tea. A form of rice beer, known as zupar or zuhrin, is also drunk.

References

Scheduled Tribes of Manipur
Indigenous peoples of South Asia
Ethnic groups in Myanmar
Ethnic groups in Northeast India
Ethnic groups in Manipur
Naga people
Ethnic groups in South Asia